Asthena octomacularia is a moth in the family Geometridae first described by John Henry Leech in 1897. It is found in Korea and Japan and China.

References

Moths described in 1897
Asthena
Moths of Asia